Macler Cody (born August 8, 1972) is a former American football wide receiver who played two seasons with the Arizona Cardinals of the National Football League. He played college football at the University of Memphis and attended Vashon High School in St. Louis, Missouri. He was also a member of the Ottawa Rough Riders, Birmingham Barracudas, Hamilton Tiger-Cats, Montreal Alouettes and Toronto Argonauts of the Canadian Football League and the Orlando Predators of the Arena Football League. In 1996, Cody led the CFL in receiving yards, becoming the Tiger-Cats Most Outstanding Player and a West Division All-Star.

References

External links
Just Sports Stats
College stats
Fanbase profile

Living people
1972 births
Players of American football from St. Louis
Players of Canadian football from St. Louis
American football wide receivers
Canadian football wide receivers
African-American players of American football
African-American players of Canadian football
Memphis Tigers football players
Ottawa Rough Riders players
Birmingham Barracudas players
Hamilton Tiger-Cats players
Orlando Predators players
Montreal Alouettes players
Arizona Cardinals players
Toronto Argonauts players
21st-century African-American sportspeople
20th-century African-American sportspeople